The Ronald Watson Gravel site (15BE249) is an archaeological site near Petersburg in Boone County, Kentucky, on an inside bend of a meander of the Ohio River. Excavations have determined that the site was occupied several times, during the Late Archaic, Middle Woodland, Late Woodland, and Middle Fort Ancient periods, although none of these are transitional occupations from one period to another. It is the best documented Middle Woodland site in the Northern Bluegrass region of Kentucky.

Occupations
The site is a  open habitation area on an alluvial terrace of sand and gravel beds overlooking the Ohio River. The eastern side of the site was occupied twice during the Late Archaic period, 3715 plus or minus 40 years before the present, during the Central Ohio Valley phase (2750-1750 BCE) and 3090 plus or minus 50 years before the present, during the Maple Creek phase (1750–1000 BCE). The site was occupied twice during the Woodland period, during the Middle Woodland (1–500 CE) with dates 83-482 CE and 258-534 CE and during the Late Woodland (500–1000 CE) with dates 655–854 CE, 668–893 CE, 692–961 CE, and 785–1017 CE. During this time period the residents of Ronald Watson relied heavily on nut resources and farmed native plants from the Eastern Agricultural Complex such as goosefoot, erect knotweed, sunflower, and maygrass. The Late Woodland occupation was during the Newtown phase and was the most intensive occupation of the site. The site was also occupied briefly during the Middle Fort Ancient period (1200 to 1400 CE), during the Anderson phase.

See also

 Big Bone Lick State Park
 Cleek–McCabe site
 Hansen site
 Bentley site
 Thompson site
 Hardin Village site

References

Archaic period in North America
Adena culture
Hopewellian peoples
Fort Ancient culture
Archaeological sites in Kentucky
Buildings and structures in Boone County, Kentucky
Native American history of Kentucky
Former populated places in Kentucky